Lopo Fortunato Ferreira do Nascimento (born 10 July 1942) is an Angolan retired politician. He served as the first Prime Minister of Angola from 11 November 1975 to 9 December 1978 and was Secretary-General of the Popular Movement for the Liberation of Angola (MPLA).

At the age of 19, he was arrested but released with the obligation to move to Cuanza Norte. He continued in underground fighting and was arrested again in 1963. This time he went to court and was convicted. He was detained for six years in the Luanda civil prison under Portuguese administration where he was tortured and during interrogations he spent three to five days without sleep, always on his feet; after a few days, Lopo felt that his feet would almost explode and that a person would still start talking. He didn't speak. In January 1969 he left and joined the Nocal brewery. He went to Algeria, via Lisbon, at the end of 1973. He left Angola because the MPLA had many problems, especially with the Daniel Chipenda East Revolt, and they asked him to go reinforce the leadership work.  

Nascimento was later Minister of Territorial Administration; after resigning from that post, he was replaced by Paulo Kassoma on 9 April 1992. He was elected as MPLA Secretary-General by the party's Central Committee in 1993.

He was the 66th candidate on the MPLA's national list in the September 2008 legislative election. He won a seat in that election, in which MPLA won an overwhelming majority in the National Assembly.

On 27 January 2013 he announced his retirement from active politics. On February 10, 2021, he was hospitalized for Covid-19 who overcame.

References 

1942 births
People from Luanda
Members of the National Assembly (Angola)
Living people
Planning ministers of Angola
Prime Ministers of Angola
Trade ministers of Angola
Territory Administration ministers of Angola
Governors of Huíla
MPLA politicians